PDFA may refer to:
 Partnership for a Drug-Free America, now known as Partnership to End Addiction: a non-profit organization which runs campaigns against teenage drug abuse in the United States.
 PDF Association, organisation that promotes the adoption and use of International Standards related to PDF technology

See also
 PDF/A, ISO-standardized version of the PDF, specialized for the digital preservation of electronic documents